Cidimar Rodrigues da Silva (born 1 July 1984), commonly known as Cidimar, is a Brazilian footballer who plays as a striker and is currently a free agent.

References

External links
 
 

1984 births
Living people
Brazilian footballers
Sport Club Internacional players
Sociedade Esportiva e Recreativa Caxias do Sul players
Guarani FC players
Paysandu Sport Club players
SpVgg Greuther Fürth players
FSV Frankfurt players
Dynamo Dresden players
VfR Aalen players
SG Sonnenhof Großaspach players
FC Biel-Bienne players
2. Bundesliga players
3. Liga players
Swiss Challenge League players
Brazilian expatriate footballers
Expatriate footballers in Germany
Expatriate footballers in Switzerland
Association football forwards
Footballers from São Paulo